Tri-Creek School Corporation is a school district in Lowell, Lake County, Indiana. The superintendent is Dr. Rod Gardin.

The corporation is governed by a five-person school board. The president of the school board is Michelle Dumbsky.

Schools

The district operates the following five schools:
Lowell High School
Lowell Middle School
Lake Prairie Elementary School
Oak Hill Elementary School
Three Creeks Elementary School

References

External links

Education in Lake County, Indiana
School districts in Indiana
School districts established in 1965
1965 establishments in Indiana